Barbara Ann Pocock AM (born 22 March 1955) is an Australian politician who was elected at the 2022 Australian federal election to become a Senator representing South Australia from July 2022. She was officially declared elected by the Australian Electoral Commission on 15 June 2022. Previously, she ran as the Greens candidate for the Division of Adelaide in the 2019 Australian federal election. She is a professor and economist.

Early life and education
Pocock was born in Berri on 22 March 1955. She grew with her family up on a mallee, sheep and wheat farm near Lameroo, 200 kilometres from the South Australian state capital of Adelaide.

Pocock moved to Adelaide in 1969 to attended Wilderness Girls High School as a boarding student before moving to Norwood High School in 1972 to complete year 12.

After finishing school, Pocock worked in shearing sheds and on farms in New Zealand for a year, and worked on farms in Australia.

She began studying economics in 1975 and graduated from the University of Adelaide in 1978 with a Bachelor of Economics (First Class Honours). She completed her PhD at the University of Adelaide in 1997 with a thesis titled "Analysis of male power in Australian unions, its effects and how to combat it."

Professional career
Pocock was employed by the Reserve Bank of Australia from 1979 as a Research Officer in the International Department in which she would write briefing notes for the Governor. Her portfolio encompassed regions including Asia, Africa, and the Pacific. It was during this time at the Reserve Bank that Pocock first became more aware of poor working conditions and the need for unionism. She states that she realised the importance of the feminist movement in the workplace after seeing numerous women, including many migrants, working in the low paid part of the Reserve Bank counting money.

After her stint at the Reserve Bank, Pocock began work in 1981 at the Department of Industrial Relations in Newcastle and the Hunter Valley Region as an Equal Employment Opportunity Officer.

Pocock joined academia in 1989 when she was employed by the South Australian College of Advanced Education as a Lecturer. She was then promoted to a Senior Lecturer at the University of Adelaide in 1997, before being promoted once again to Associate Professor in 2002. After her time at the University of Adelaide she began work at the University of South Australia as a Professor in 2006, before becoming an Emeritus Professor at the same institution in 2015. She established and led the Centre for Work and Life at UniSA from 2006-2014.

In 2010 Pocock was awarded a Member of the Order of Australia (AM) for services to industrial relations and social justice.

Political views
Pocock has long been a strong supporter of the feminist movement and the labour movement. As a researcher and academic she has written numerous books and academic journal articles on the labour market, work-life conflict, unionism, low pay, inequality and vocational education. She has focused her research on industrial relations, work and family, pay equity, and inequality in the workplace. Pocock is a strong believer in the importance of trade unions and advocated for equality through fair labour law.  She has called for increased access to sick leave and holiday leave for casual workers and argued that the casual loading does not compensate for the loss of such conditions. She has also advocated against long working hours and fairer conditions for working carers, including parental leave and early childhood education and care. Pocock is a critic of the legislative restrictions on strikes and the outlawing of secondary boycotts.

Pocock has called for JobSeeker unemployment payments and all forms of income support to be increased to $88 a day, and an improvement in rental rights and the availability of public housing. When asked, as a professor of economics, if such Greens policies would crash the Australian economy she replied "No". She has pointed to the historically high levels of the profit share in Australia and the consequences for inequality of stalled wages and falling real incomes for workers.

Pocock is also a campaigner for urgent climate change action, LGBTQ+ rights, refugee rights, and anti-nuclear policies. Since 2015 she has been a member of 'Mothers for a Sustainable South Australia' (MOSSA), a campaign group of South Australian mothers who have opposed proposals for a high level nuclear waste dump in South Australia, and more recently the disposal of medium and low level waste in the state.

Pocock argues for free University, TAFE, and for the forgiveness of student debt due to the large economic burden placed upon university students. She points to the fact that she has had the advantages of living on a safe planet, enjoying free higher education, access to secure employment and the chance to buy a home through an affordable mortgage - all things unavailable to so many young Australians now." When launching the Greens' student debt policy with New South Wales Senator Mehreen Faruqi, Pocock further stressed the importance of free higher education arguing that "high levels of student debt stand in the way of secure housing for many young people."

Personal life
Pocock has two children. She separated from their father in 2007 after 22 years. She now lives with her partner, Ian Campbell. She is a Port Adelaide football fan, and a recreational gardener, painter, sewer and writer.

Published works

References

External links
 

1955 births
Living people
University of Adelaide alumni
Academic staff of the University of Adelaide
Academic staff of the University of South Australia
Australian economists
Members of the Order of Australia
Australian Greens members of the Parliament of Australia
21st-century Australian politicians
Members of the Australian Senate for South Australia
Women members of the Australian Senate
21st-century Australian women politicians
Members of the Australian Senate